Miss and Mister Azerbaijan (or Miss Azərbaycan) is a national beauty pageant in Azerbaijan.

History
The national beauty contest "Miss Azerbaijan" is held in the country since 1996. Each year, before the beginning of the next contest, an organizing committee which involves representatives of well-known media persons, voluntarily provide organizational support for the contest. The organizing committee is also working with various media organizations, photographers and photo studios, videographers, designers, freelancers, and the sponsors who provide their services to competition on mutually beneficial terms. 16 ladies are selected after casting and the qualifying round for the final selection. During the final round an independent jury consisting of representatives of culture and arts, show business and media, and sponsors, evaluate the finalists' performance by a 10-point system. According to the point calculation results, the main and sponsor nominations are distributed.

National Franchise
All the contests "Miss Azerbaijan" had been held by the license issued by the Ministry of Culture of Azerbaijan until 2006. After 2006, under the new rules, the Ministry canceled the issuance of licenses for cultural events, including the contests.

Since 2013, Azerbaijan selected the winner for Miss Universe. Instead, the winner of Miss Azerbaijan 2012 participated at the event. The first time the country participated in the pageant in Miss Universe 2013 on 9 November. Aysel Manafova is the first Miss Universe Azerbaijan titleholder.

Nowadays Miss Azerbaijan becomes the national titleholder for Miss Universe, Miss Intercontinental and Top Model of the World.                  In 2020 Azerbaijan will return to Miss Universe with Banu Shujai

Titleholders

References

External links
Official website 

Azerbaijan
Azerbaijan
Recurring events established in 1996
Azerbaijani awards